Le Passage du Rhin is a 1960 French film directed by André Cayatte. It was released in the US as Tomorrow is My Turn.

Plot
The film tells the story of two French soldiers in the aftermath of the German invasion of France who become forced labourers on a German farm under the Service du travail obligatoire programme (STO), but become involved in the lives of their captors.

Cast 
 Charles Aznavour : Roger Perrin
 Nicole Courcel : Florence
 Georges Rivière : Jean Durrieu
 Cordula Trantow : Helga
 Georges Chamarat : le boulanger / Baker
 Jean Marchat : Michel Delmas
 Albert Dinan : le milicien Cadix
 Michel Etcheverry : Ludovic
 Ruth Hausmeister : Frau Keßler
 Benno Hoffmann : Otto
 Henri Lambert : Louis
 Lotte Ledl : Lotte
 Bernard Musson : le prisonnier libéré
 Alfred Schieske : Fritz Keßler
 Serge Frédéric
 Albert Rémy
 Colette Régis
 Jean Verner
 Betty Schneider : Alice
 Nerio Bernardi : Rodier

Awards
The film won the Golden Lion at the Venice Film Festival.

External links
 

1960 films
Films directed by André Cayatte
French drama films
1960s French-language films
Golden Lion winners
1960 drama films
Films about Nazi Germany
UFA GmbH films
West German films
1960s French films